Dušan Kuciak (born 21 May 1985) is a Slovak professional footballer who plays as a goalkeeper for Polish club Lechia Gdańsk and the Slovakia national team. He is the younger brother of Martin Kuciak, who plays as a goalkeeper for Považská Bystrica.

Club career
Dušan Kuciak was part of Žilina youth academy. Aged 16, he signed his first contract with the Slovak Superliga side AS Trenčín.

MŠK Žilina
After a two-year spell in Trenčín, he returned to Žilina, where he was the second-choice keeper, the first-choice being Ján Mucha. Despite not playing at all, he was linked by the English Premier League side West Ham, where he was loaned for 6 months. In January 2006, he returned to Žilina, and he established himself as the first-choice keeper. He won Corgoň Liga with Žilina in 2006–07 season.

FC Vaslui
On 26 June 2008, he signed a three-year contract with Romanian side FC Vaslui. He was bought to replace Cristian Hăisan, while he was suspended, but Kuciak established himself quickly as the first-choice keeper. He was the only player that season, who played every minute, and the first in Vaslui's history who achieved this feat. At the end of the season, he established another record, having the most clean-sheets in Vaslui's short spell in Liga I. Also, he captained the team a few matches, while Cânu was on the bench. On 4 August, he received a red card in the Europa League match against Omonia Nicosia. On 26 September, after a conflict with team's coach, he was relegated on the bench, and seemed to lost his place in the team, but because of Hăisan's poor rating, re-established as the first-choice keeper. At the end of the season, he established another record for Vaslui, saving 4 out of 5 penalties, and also receiving only 17 goals in 23 matches. After three seasons at Vaslui, Kuciak left the club in the summer of 2011.

Legia Warsaw
Kuciak joined the Polish club Legia Warsaw in August 2011. In August 2013, he extended his contract at the club until 2016.

West Ham United

In January 2013, West Ham United were reported to be in talks with the goalkeeper.

Hull City
On 1 February 2016, Kuciak signed an 18-month contract with Hull City. Kuciak made his debut on 23 August 2016 in the second round of the EFL Cup away to Exeter City that City won 3–1.

International career
He made his international debut for the Slovakia national team in a 2–1 away win against UAE on 10 December 2006. After a two-year absence in the national team, he was called again in 2009, because of his impressive form at Vaslui. He was named in the provisional 30-man squad for 2010 World Cup. He played in the Slovakia's second warm-up game, where he was replaced in the 85th minute, because of an injury. However, he was kept for the final 23-man squad, for 2010 World Cup, where he wore the Number 23 Shirt.

He was named in the final Slovakia squad for the UEFA Euro 2020 tournament. Kuciak last appeared in the national team selection under Štefan Tarkovič in November 2021.

Career statistics

International

Honours
MŠK Žilina
Slovak Superliga: 2006–07
Slovak Super Cup: 2007

FC Vaslui
UEFA Intertoto Cup: 2008

Legia Warsaw
Ekstraklasa: 2012–13, 2013–14, 2015–16
Polish Cup: 2011–12, 2014–15, 2015–16

Hull City
Football League Championship play-offs: 2016

Lechia Gdańsk
Polish Cup: 2018–19
Polish Super Cup: 2019

Individual
Ekstraklasa Goalkeeper of the Season: 2019–20

References

External links
 
 
 
 
 

1985 births
Living people
Sportspeople from Žilina
Slovak footballers
Slovak expatriate footballers
Slovakia international footballers
Association football goalkeepers
AS Trenčín players
MŠK Žilina players
West Ham United F.C. players
FC Vaslui players
Legia Warsaw players
Ekstraklasa players
Hull City A.F.C. players
Lechia Gdańsk players
Slovak Super Liga players
Liga I players
2010 FIFA World Cup players
UEFA Euro 2020 players
Expatriate footballers in England
Slovak expatriate sportspeople in England
Expatriate footballers in Poland
Slovak expatriate sportspeople in Poland
Expatriate footballers in Romania
Slovak expatriate sportspeople in Romania